Coringa, also known as Korangi by natives, is a tiny coastal village of the East Godavari district, in Andhra Pradesh, India. Coringa consists of the village and one adjacent island, which was whimsically named Hope Island by British officials in the hope that it would be protected from environmental disasters.

The French-flagged ship Harmonie, on a voyage from the Île Bourbon (now Réunion) to Pondicherry, was wrecked at Coringa in October 1834. Her crew were rescued. The current Coringa is established by Westcot, a British resident of Injaram around 1757 within some distance from Old Coringa village. Now these two villages exist on the opposite sides of the Coringa River.

Cyclones
In 1789, a cyclone hit Coringa. A strong storm surge caused by the cyclone resulted in the deaths of around 20,000 people by drowning.

In 1839, Coringa was subject to a colossal cyclone with strong winds. Due to the seawater and strong winds, most houses collapsed in Coringa and therefore over 300,000 residents were killed in Coringa.

References

External links
 

Villages in East Godavari district